Abdelhak Maach (born 1966) is a Moroccan judoka. He competed in the men's lightweight event at the 1988 Summer Olympics.

References

1966 births
Living people
Moroccan male judoka
Olympic judoka of Morocco
Judoka at the 1988 Summer Olympics
Place of birth missing (living people)
20th-century Moroccan people